In contract bridge, a single suiter (or single-suited hand) is a hand containing at least six cards in one suit and with all other suits being at least two cards shorter than this longest suit. Many hand patterns can be classified as single suiters. Typical examples are 6-3-2-2, 6-3-3-1 and 7-3-2-1 distribution.

Single-suiters form the cornerstone of preemptive bidding. Weak single-suiters with six card length are traditionally opened preemptively at the two level, whilst seven carders are used to preempt at the three level. The modern trend is to lower these minimum length requirements, especially when non-vulnerable. Conventional preemptive openings used to introduce a weak single-suited hand include the multi 2 diamonds and the gambling 3NT conventions.

Over an opposing opening, single suiters are usually introduced via a natural overcall. But see also list of defenses to 1NT.

See also
Two suiter
Three suiter
Balanced hand
Preempt

Contract bridge